In computational number theory, Cornacchia's algorithm is an algorithm for solving the Diophantine equation , where  and d and m are coprime. The algorithm was described in 1908 by Giuseppe Cornacchia.

The algorithm
Then use the Euclidean algorithm to find ,  and so on; stop when . In this case there is no primitive solution.

To find non-primitive solutions  where , note that the existence of such a solution implies that  divides  (and equivalently, that if  is square-free, then all solutions are primitive). If such a solution is found, then  will be a solution to the original equation.

Example
Solve the equation .

References

External links
 

Number theoretic algorithms